There are two art museums named after Frederick R. Weisman:  

 Frederick R. Weisman Art Museum, Minneapolis, part of the University of Minnesota, Twin Cities 
 Frederick R. Weisman Museum of Art, Malibu, California, part of Pepperdine University

See also
 Frederick R. Weisman Art Foundation in Los Angeles, California